Feeding The Abscess is Martyr's 3rd full-length album. It was released by Galy Records in 2006.

Track listing

Personnel
Martyr
 Daniel Mongrain – lead vocals, guitar
 Martin Carbonneau - guitar
 François Mongrain - bass, death growls
 Patrice Hamelin drums, percussion
Production
 Pierre Rémillard - producer
 Yannick St-Amand - producer
 Alan Douches - mastering

References

2006 albums
Martyr (band) albums
Galy Records albums